The 1978 Tour de France was the 65th edition of the Tour de France, one of cycling's Grand Tours. The Tour began in Leiden, the Netherlands, with a prologue individual time trial on 29 June, and Stage 11 occurred on 11 July with a mountainous stage to Saint-Lary-Soulan Pla d'Adet. The race finished in Paris on 23 July.

Prologue
29 June 1978 – Leiden to Leiden,  (ITT)

Due to bad weather, the prologue result did not contribute to the general classification and a yellow jersey wasn't awarded.

Stage 1a
30 June 1978 – Leiden to Sint Willebrord,

Stage 1b
30 June 1978 – Sint Willebrord to Brussels,

Stage 2
1 July 1978 – Brussels to Saint-Amand-les-Eaux,

Stage 3
2 July 1978 – Saint-Amand-les-Eaux to Saint-Germain-en-Laye,

Stage 4
3 July 1978 – Évreux to Caen,  (TTT)

Stage 5
4 July 1978 – Caen to Mazé–Montgeoffroy,

Stage 6
5 July 1978 – Mazé–Montgeoffroy to Poitiers,

Stage 7
6 July 1978 – Poitiers to Bordeaux,

Stage 8
7 July 1978 – Saint-Émilion to Sainte-Foy-la-Grande,  (ITT)

Stage 9
8 July 1978 – Bordeaux to Biarritz,

Rest day 1
9 July 1978 – Biarritz

Stage 10
10 July 1978 – Biarritz to Pau,

Stage 11
11 July 1978 – Pau to Saint-Lary-Soulan Pla d'Adet,

References

1978 Tour de France
Tour de France stages